The elm cultivar Ulmus 'Aspera' was listed (as U. stricta aspera) without description by Loddiges, (Hackney, London), in his catalogue of 1823. Considered only "possibly procera" by Green.

Description
Not available.

Cultivation
No specimens are known to survive.

References

Ulmus articles missing images
Elm cultivars
Missing elm cultivars